16S rRNA (guanine1207-N2)-methyltransferase (m2G1207 methyltransferase) is an enzyme with systematic name S-adenosyl-L-methionine:16S rRNA (guanine1207-N2)-methyltransferase. This enzyme catalyses the following chemical reaction

 S-adenosyl-L-methionine + guanine1207 in 16S rRNA  S-adenosyl-L-homocysteine + N2-methylguanine1207 in 16S rRNA

The enzyme reacts well with 30S subunits reconstituted from 16S RNA transcripts and 30S proteins but is almost inactive with the corresponding free RNA.

References

External links 
 

EC 2.1.1